Phantom of the Opera is a 1943 American romantic horror film directed by Arthur Lubin, loosely based on Gaston Leroux's 1910 novel The Phantom of the Opera and its 1925 film adaptation starring Lon Chaney. Produced and distributed by Universal Pictures, the film stars Nelson Eddy, Susanna Foster and Claude Rains, and was composed by Edward Ward.

The first adaptation of the source material to be filmed in Technicolor, Phantom of the Opera was even more freely adapted than Universal's silent picture. The film reused Universal's elaborate replica of the Opéra Garnier interior, which had originally been created for the 1925 film. Despite mixed critical reviews, the film was a box office success. It is also the only classic Universal horror film to win an Oscar, for Art Direction and Cinematography.

Plot

Violinist Erique Claudin is dismissed from the Paris Opera House after revealing that he is losing the use of the fingers of his left hand. Unbeknownst to the conductor, who assumes Claudin can support himself, the musician has used all his money to help anonymously fund voice lessons for Christine Dubois, a young soprano to whom he is devoted. Meanwhile, Christine is pressured by Inspector Raoul Dubert to quit the Opera and marry him. But famed opera baritone Anatole Garron hopes to win Christine's heart. Christine considers them both good friends but doesn't openly express if she loves them.

In a desperate attempt to earn money, Claudin submits a piano concerto he has written for publication. After weeks of not hearing a response about his concerto, he becomes worried and returns to the publisher, Maurice Pleyel, to ask about it. Pleyel rudely tells him to leave. Claudin hears his concerto being played in the office and is convinced that Pleyel is trying to steal it; unbeknownst to him, a visiting Franz Liszt had been playing and endorsing the concerto. Enraged, Claudin strangles Pleyel. Georgette, the publisher's assistant, throws etching acid in Claudin’s face, horribly scarring him. Now wanted for murder, Claudin flees into the sewers of the Opera and covers his disfigurement with a prop mask stolen from the Opera house, thus becoming the Phantom.

During a performance of the opera Amour et Gloire, The Phantom drugs a glass of wine which prima donna Mme. Biancarolli drinks, knocking her unconscious. The director puts Christine in her place, and she dazzles the audience with her singing. Biancarolli, who suspects that Garron and Christine are responsible for drugging her, orders Raoul to arrest them, but he says he cannot because there is no evidence. Biancarolli says she will forget the affair only if Christine's performance is not mentioned in the papers. The following night, the Phantom kills Biancarolli and her maid, and the opera is subsequently closed.

After some time, the opera's owners receive a note demanding that Christine replace Biancarolli. To catch the Phantom, Raoul comes up with a plan: not let Christine sing during a performance of the (fictional) Russian opera Le prince masqué du Caucase ("The Masked Prince of the Caucasus") to lure the Phantom out into the open. Garron plans to have Liszt play Claudin’s concerto after the performance, but the Phantom strangles one of Raoul's men and heads to the auditorium's domed ceiling. He then brings down the large chandelier on the audience, causing chaos. As the audience and the crew flee, The Phantom takes Christine down underground. He tells Christine that he loves her and she will now sing all she wants, but only for him.

Raoul, Anatole, and the police begin pursuing them underground. Just as the Phantom and Christine arrive in his lair, they hear Liszt and the orchestra playing Claudin's concerto. The Phantom plays along with it on his piano. Christine watches, realizing the concerto was written around the melody of a lullaby she has known since childhood. Raoul and Anatole hear the Phantom playing and follow the sound. Overjoyed, the Phantom urges Christine to sing, which she does. While the Phantom is distracted by the music, Christine sneaks up and pulls off his mask, revealing his disfigured face. At that same moment, Raoul and Anatole break-in. Claudin grabs a sword to fight them with. Raoul fires his gun at Claudin, but Anatole knocks Raoul's arm, and the shot hits the ceiling, causing a cave-in. Anatole and Raoul escape with Christine, while Claudin is seemingly crushed to death by the falling rocks.

Later, Anatole and Raoul demand that Christine choose one of them. She surprises them by choosing to marry neither one of them, instead choosing to pursue her singing career, inspired by Claudin’s devotion to her future. The film ends with Anatole and Raoul going to dinner together.

Cast

 
 Nelson Eddy as Anatole Garron
 Susanna Foster as Christine DuBois
 Claude Rains as Erique Claudin/The Phantom of the Opera
 Edgar Barrier as Raoul Dubert
 Jane Farrar as Biancarolli
 J. Edward Bromberg as Amiot
 Fritz Feld as Lecours  
 Frank Puglia as Villeneuve
 Fritz Leiber as Franz Liszt
 Steven Geray as Vercheres 
 Miles Mander as Maurice Pleyel
 Hans Herbert as Marcel 
 Hume Cronyn as Gerard

Development and production

Universal first announced a remake of The Phantom of the Opera in 1935. Set to be directed by Anatole Litvak, this version would have been set in contemporary Paris, and would have portrayed the Phantom as a psychologically wounded World War I veteran who was physically unharmed, but imagined that he was disfigured. However, development lingered as the studio faced financial problems that resulted in the ousting of the original film's producer Carl Laemmle and his son, Carl Laemmle Jr.

Plans for the remake finally surfaced again in November 1941, when Henry Koster became attached to direct. Koster discarded the previous screenplay, and envisioned a new version of the story in which the Phantom was Christine's father. Under Koster, the initial casting included Boris Karloff as The Phantom, Allan Jones as Raoul, and Deanna Durbin as Christine. Eddy was cast after leaving MGM for a two-picture deal with Universal. This led to Durbin refusing the role, not wanting to be compared to Eddy's frequent film partner Jeanette MacDonald, who Durbin admired. Karloff also became unavailable, and Koster also considered Cesar Romero, Feodor Chaliapin, Charles Laughton and Broderick Crawford for the Phantom. Producer George Waggner eventually fired Koster from the project.

After Koster's firing, Arthur Lubin was brought on to direct. Under Lubin, Koster's subplot about the Phantom being Christine's father was jettisoned, because it gave the romantic elements of their relationship incestuous overtones; however, the Phantom's obsession with Christine is not completely stated within the film. Lubin cast Rains in the film almost immediately, saying he was his "only choice" for the role. Foster, who had just left Paramount Pictures, was cast after meeting Lubin through a mutual friend, and auditioning for Waggner. Filming began on January 21, 1943.

Lux Radio Theater presented a radio adaption of the film on September 13, 1943. Nelson Eddy, Susanna Foster and Edgar Barrier reprised their roles from the film; Basil Rathbone replaced Rains as Erique Claudin. This presentation was produced and hosted by Cecil B. DeMille.

Score
The score was written by Edward Ward. For the opera sequences, Ward adapted music from Tchaikovsky's Symphony No. 4 as well as using themes by Chopin Amour et Gloire. He also composed an original theme, Lullaby of the Bells, which was heard in the film as the Phantom's piano concerto. The movie begins with a fragment from "Martha, oder Der Markt zu Richmond (Martha, or The Market at Richmond)" written by composer Friedrich von Flotow.
Soundtrack Credits 
LULLABY OF THE BELLS
(uncredited)
Written by Edward Ward
Lyrics George Waggner
Sung by Susanna Foster and Nelson Eddy
MARTHA (Act III, opera excerpt)
(uncredited)
Written by Friedrich von Flotow
Lyrics translated by William von Wymetal
Sung by Nelson Eddy, Jane Farrar (dubbed by Sally Sweetland), Susanna Foster & company
AMOUR ET GLOIRE
(uncredited)
(French Opera sequence)
Adapted by Edward Ward from themes by Frédéric Chopin
Lyrics by George Waggner, translated by William von Wymetal
Sung by Nelson Eddy, Jane Farrar (dubbed by Sally Sweetland), Susanna Foster & company
LE PRINCE MASQUE DU CAUCASUS
(uncredited)
(Russian Opera sequence)
Adapted by Edward Ward (from Pyotr Ilyich Tchaikovsky's "4th Symphony")
Lyrics by George Waggner, translated by William von Wymetal
Sung by Nelson Eddy, Nicki Andre & company

Reception
Contemporary reviews were mixed. Bosley Crowther of The New York Times panned the film for being "watered down" from the original, calling the opening sequence "the only one in the film in which the potential excitement of the story is realized", while otherwise the "richness of décor and music is precisely what gets in the way of the tale". Variety called it "a vivid, elaborate, and, within its original story limitations, an effective production geared for substantial grosses". Harrison's Reports called it "a good entertainment, the sort that will direct an appeal to all types of audiences". David Lardner's review in The New Yorker dismissed the film, calling it "by no means a sample of the march of progress in the film world. The old version had Lon Chaney, who scared you plenty, and the new one has Claude Rains, who somehow doesn't". A review in the Monthly Film Bulletin stated that "rarely has a story so novelettish had such conscientious technical excellence lavished upon it" specifically noting that "it ranks among the screen's highest achievements in sound". The review continued that "the same careful effort-if not the same dazzling success-is apparent in casting, camera work, costuming and the numerous sets".

In modern times, the film has received more positive reviews. Rotten Tomatoes gave this version of Phantom of the Opera an average score of 76%, based on 21 reviews from critics. The site's consensus states: "Though it lives beneath the 1925 version, Claude Rains plays title character well in this landmark color version of the classic tragedy". Diabolique magazine said "the story was reconfigured as a musical more than a horror saga... Once you accept that, this works well on its own terms and Lubin's touch is assured; it looks splendid". However, many horror fans — especially those of the classic Universal monster films — have criticized the film for focusing on more on the musical aspects of the film, and downplaying or eliminating the horror elements that were found in the original film.

Lon Chaney, Jr. was reportedly unhappy that the studio never seriously considered him to play the role made famous by his father, even though he was under contract to them. Chaney reportedly also resented Rains for his portrayal.

Cancelled sequel: The Climax
Following the success of Phantom of the Opera, Universal announced that a sequel would be made, titled The Climax. Nelson Eddy and Susanna Foster were to return, along with Claude Rains as the Phantom, most likely meaning that his character survived the cave-in at the finale of the first film. The sequel, however, was later cancelled due to story troubles and problems concerning the availability of Claude Rains. Universal reworked the film completely, so it is not related to Phantom of the Opera; Foster stars in the film, alongside the original choice for the Phantom, Boris Karloff.

Awards
The film was nominated for four Oscars, becoming the only film in the studio's horror franchise to be nominated. It ultimately won in two categories at the 16th Academy Awards ceremony:
 Art Direction (Color) (John B. Goodman, Alexander Golitzen, Russell A. Gausman and Ira S. Webb) (Won)
 Cinematography (Color) (Hal Mohr and W. Howard Greene) (Won)
 Music (Scoring of a Musical Picture) (Edward Ward) (Nominated)
 Sound Recording (Bernard B. Brown) (Nominated)

References

External links

 
 
 
 
 
  Phantom of the Opera on Lux Radio Theater: September 13, 1943

1943 films
1943 horror films
1943 musical films
Remakes of American films
Horror film remakes
1940s English-language films
Films about composers
Films about opera
Films based on horror novels
Films based on The Phantom of the Opera
Films directed by Arthur Lubin
Films set in a theatre
Films scored by Edward Ward (composer)
Films whose art director won the Best Art Direction Academy Award
Films whose cinematographer won the Best Cinematography Academy Award
American monster movies
Sound film remakes of silent films
Universal Pictures films
Films set in the 1880s
Films set in Paris
Films about violins and violinists
American musical films
Burn survivors in fiction
1940s American films